The Mysterious Cities of Gold, originally released in Japan as  and released in France as Les Mystérieuses Cités d'Or, is an animated series which was co-produced by DiC Audiovisuel and Studio Pierrot.

Set in 1532, the series follows the adventures of a young Spanish boy named Esteban who joins a voyage to the New World in search of the lost Seven Cities of Gold and his father.

The series was originally broadcast in Japan and the French version, edited with different characterization and music, was subsequently redubbed and distributed in many countries. It is currently licensed for English-language home video release in the United Kingdom, Australia, and North America by Fabulous Films.

Opening narration
It is the 16th century. From all over Europe, great ships sail west to conquer the New World, the Americas. The men, eager to seek their fortune, to find new adventures in new lands. They long to cross uncharted seas and discover unknown countries, to find secret gold on a mountain trail high in the Andes. They dream of following the path of the setting sun that leads to El Dorado and the Mysterious Cities of Gold.

Plot
In 1532, a Spanish orphan named Esteban joins Mendoza, a navigator, and his associates Sancho and Pedro, in their search for one of the Seven Cities of Gold in the New World, hoping to find his father. They are joined on their quest by Zia, an Incan girl (who was kidnapped by Gomez, Gaspard, Perez and Mendoza), and Tao, the last descendant of the sunken empire of Mu (Hiva in the English dub).

The series is a mix of ancient South American history, archaeology, and science fiction. During their journey, the travelers encounter the Mayas, Incas, and Olmecs. They discover many lost technological wonders of the Mu Empire, including a solar-powered ship (the Solaris) and The Golden Condor, a huge solar-powered ornithopter (mechanical bird), capable of traveling considerable distances under the sun's power alone. They are constantly pursued by antagonists Gomez and Gaspard, who are also in search of the Cities of Gold.

The Seven Cities of Gold were built by the Emperor of Hiva out of fear that a global war would destroy all civilizations. Such a war actually broke out, destroying the Empires of Mu and Atlantis when they used the "Weapons of the Sun". The Seven Cities of Gold hold copies of books in their "Universal Libraries" as well as powerful artefacts, including the "Great Legacy", a portable fusion reactor. Other elements of this technology turn up in unexpected places, like the Solaris on Tao's home island, Esteban's and Zia's medallions as keys to the Cities, and Tao's jar as an important piece of the Great Legacy.

Reminiscences of this ancient story are present in Inca legends written on golden quipu, which only Zia can read. This triggers an obsessive quest for the Cities of Gold on the part of the Spaniards Mendoza, Gomez, Gaspard and Francisco Pizarro.

Esteban seeks his long-lost father and he is also tied to Mendoza, who rescued Esteban from a sinking ship when he was a baby. Esteban seems to have a magical ability to make the sun appear, which proves to be an invaluable asset throughout the series. Zia also seeks her father, from whom she was taken and was brought to Spain as a gift for the princess Margarita when she was seven years old. She has a medallion just like the one which Esteban carries.

Tao seeks signs of his ancestors. He possesses an encyclopedia which contains information about their lost technology as well as a mysterious jar which according to the legend, only the High Priest of the City of Gold can open, and it proves to be the Great Legacy's cooling or control rod system. Mendoza, Sancho and Pedro are motivated by their search for gold, but Mendoza genuinely appears to be fond of the three children.

The Olmecs are the descendants of survivors of the global war who hid under their mountain. Only their elite were able to survive, suspended in cryogenic hibernation. The Olmecs do not appear to be human—or if they were once human, it is implied that they were horribly mutated by the fallout of the nuclear war that destroyed their ancestors. They are short and thin and they also have pointed ears and enlarged frontal bones. They are highly intelligent but they are devious and selfish.

Led by their king, Menator, the Olmecs seek an artefact called the "Great Legacy" in order to power their cryogenic systems, as well as samples of healthy cells from the children in order to combat their mutations and their sterility. Their technology is generally inferior to modern technology, and they use weapons such as spears and swords. They maintain some elements of their advanced technological heritage, such as the stasis and medical technology which is used to keep the elite of the Olmecs in suspended animation until an opportunity to revive them arises, technology which is powered by what appears to be a geothermal power system.

This power system is destroyed during an escape by the children and Mendoza, causing the Olmecs to conduct a frantic search for the fusion reactor core (the Great Treasure) which is hidden inside the City of Gold. They also possess a flying machine which appears to have been constructed with the same type of advanced technology which the Golden Condor was constructed with. It is armed with a particle beam or a focused heat weapon which is very powerful.

Eventually, the Olmecs succeed, at great cost, in taking control of the Great Legacy. It begins to melt down without the moderation which is supposed to be provided by Tao's jar. The resulting earthquakes and volcanism destroy the City of Gold. A world-threatening meltdown is avoided by the personal sacrifice of Esteban's father who, acting as the High Priest of the Cities, is presumed to be dead after he replaces the jar. At the end of the series, Mendoza, Sancho and Pedro, who have salvaged some gold before the city's destruction, return to Spain, while Esteban and his friends set out across the Pacific Ocean on the golden condor in search of the remaining Cities of Gold.

Characters

The main cast of the series dubbed into American English, includes:
  – An orphan who was rescued at sea as a baby ten years ago by the Spanish navigator Mendoza. He wears one of the two sun medallions. He dreams of adventure and is extremely impulsive. Esteban has a fear of heights which is exacerbated by the people of Barcelona who believe that he is the "Child of the Sun" and hoist him up high at the port to call out the sun to aid the departing ships. He joins the Spaniards on their search for one of The Seven Cities of Gold in the New World, hoping to find his father.
  – The daughter of an Inca high priest. She was kidnapped from Peru five years ago, when she was seven, by the Spanish invaders and given as a present to the Queen of Spain for her daughter, Princess Margarita. She met Esteban when she was kidnapped by Mendoza for Governor Pizarro who wanted her to read the golden quipu. Zia wears a sun medallion like Esteban's, with an interlocking sun and moon disc.
  – The last living descendant of the sunken empire of Mu (Hiva in the English dub). He lived alone on the Galápagos Islands following the death of his father. Initially he is evasive of the others' company when they wash up on his island, but when the ship Solaris was revealed he joined them on their journey. He carries with him an encyclopedia handed down to him by his Hiva ancestors. Being the most intelligent of the children, he often takes a more studious approach to problem solving with Esteban sometimes becoming irritated due to his own impulsive nature.
  – A Spaniard and navigator for the Spanish fleet. He rescued a young Esteban from a shipwreck during one of his voyages. An experienced sailor, proficient navigator and master swordsman, Mendoza places himself in the role of a leader. It is not always clear, however, where his loyalties lie and he is often at odds with the other characters. He is accompanied by fellow sailors Sancho and Pedro. Mendoza has spent many years searching for information about the cities of gold, following his theft of a piece of Esteban's medallion when he rescued the latter as an infant. His full name is revealed to be Juan Carlos Mendoza in season three.
They get into a lot of scrapes, and make several attempts to escape from Mendoza's watchful eye, once they realize how tiring the quest is.

Production
The story was written by Jean Chalopin and Bernard Deyriès, and is very loosely based on the novel The King's Fifth by Scott O'Dell. The series' chief director was Hisayuki Toriumi. The producers were Max Saldinger and Atsumi Yajima (NHK). The musical score was composed by Haim Saban and Shuki Levy in the Western version (Nobuyoshi Koshibe in the Japanese version). Shingo Araki was involved with the series as an animator and some episodes were directed by Toyoo Ashida and Mizuho Nishikubo.

Originally Koshibe's score was to be used for the Western version as well. In contrast, Bernard Deyriès recalled his reaction to the proposed music he heard from Ulysses 31 in that he felt that the score was rather understated as he was expecting a more adventurous feel, something akin to films like Indiana Jones. At that point Haim Saban and Shuki Levy had met Deyriès, and became involved with the soundtracks of Ulysses 31 and The Mysterious Cities of Gold.

The theme song to the Western version was performed by Noam Kaniel, an associate of Levy's.

Media

Broadcast 

The series originally aired in Japan on NHK (the national public broadcaster) and premiered on June 29, 1982, running weekly for 39 episodes until its conclusion on June 7, 1983.

The French version first aired on Antenne 2 from September 1983 to July 1984. All non-Japanese versions of the series originate from the French version.

The series first aired in English in the United States on the Nickelodeon cable network from June 30, 1986, to June 29, 1990. in the United Kingdom, twice on Children's BBC in 1986/87 and 1989 and on The Children's Channel in 1994/1995; in Ireland on Network 2 in 1988/1989; and in Australia, on the public broadcaster ABC in the early to mid-1980s.

The series also aired in Turkey on TRT; in East Germany on DFF and later in unified Germany on ORB, MDR and Your Family Entertainment; in Italy on Rai 2; in Sweden on TV3; in Spain on ETB 1; in Bulgaria on BNT 2 and Diema 2; in Israel on IETV and Zoom; in Hungary (translated as "The Kingdom of Inca" - "Az Inka Királyság"); in Portugal on RTP; in New Zealand on TV One and TV2; in South Africa on TV1 and SABC1; in Belgium BRT; in Russia; in Namibia on both SWABC and NBC; in Gibraltar on GBC TV; in Zambia on ZNBC; in Luxembourg on RTL Télévision and in several Arab nations.

Beginning in 2015, the English version is shown in Australia on SBS channel NITV.

The English version was also available via streaming for a limited time on Hulu and Netflix.

In 2017, the French version was repeated on Unis in Canada.

DVD and digital releases 
The Mysterious Cities of Gold was released on both VHS and DVD in France, Belgium, Japan, Portugal, Canada (in French) and Germany. In 2007, Fabulous Films acquired the licence to release the series in Region 2 (Europe), Region 1, and Region 4. All 39 episodes of the series were released in the United Kingdom on June 23, 2008, as a six-disc DVD set with the picture and sound restored. The DVD was released in Australia in August 2008. It was released in North America on April 7, 2009. The show is also available to purchase and stream via digital retailers.

Sequel 

Three new seasons of 26 episodes each have been produced, picking up the storyline where the 1982 series left off. Unlike the original series, this sequel is produced entirely in France, as a co-joint venture between the French television channel TF1, the Belgian channel La Trois, the French animation company Blue Spirit and Jean Chalopin's company Movie-Plus Group. The new seasons see the series move to China and subsequently Japan. The design of the characters are more or less the same, although some subtle changes have been made to their physical appearances. Jean Chalopin and Bernard Deyriès act as creative consultants on the new series, with Chalopin concentrating particularly on the scripts (which are written by Hadrian Soulez-Lariviere from Chalopin's own draft for the sequel) and Deyriès focusing particularly on the graphical aspects. New background music is composed by the original theme song's singer Noam Kaniel.

A 45-minute special, consisting of the first two episodes of the new series, was released on December 9, 2012, on TF1. The series started its regular airing during the first half of 2013. Like the 1982 series, each episode has a summary of the previous episode, a teaser to the next and a small documentary at the end. The voices for the English-language version were recorded in Paris under the direction of voice director, Matthew Géczy. The sequel received a premiere on the Kix (UK and Ireland) channel in the United Kingdom on November 9, 2013, before a daily airing due to start on November 11.

In 2016, the third season of the show started production, followed by a fourth in 2020.

Soundtrack releases

Score by Nobuyoshi Koshibe and Katsuo Ohno 
 1982, Starchild Records, Taiyou no Ko Esteban BGM Collection Vol.1. LP containing 17 tracks from the Japanese score.
 1983, Starchild Records, Taiyou no Ko Esteban BGM Collection Vol.2. LP containing a further 13 tracks from the Japanese score.
 1983, Starchild Records, Ougon no Condor/Sorezore no Utopia. EP containing two tracks from the Japanese score.
 1983, Starchild Records, Boukenshatachi/Itsuka Dokoka de Anata ni Atta. EP containing two tracks from the Japanese score.

Score by Haim Saban and Shuki Levy
 1983, Saban Records, Les Mysterieuses Cités D'Or. Seven-inch of the title music with Zia's theme as the B side.
 1983, Saban Records, Les Mystérieuses Cités D'Or (Bande Originale De La Série Télévisée). LP containing 16 unedited tracks.
 1998, RYM Musique, Les Mystérieuses Cités D'Or. CD reissue, sourced from vinyl, of the LP with two bonus tracks from the series Inspector Gadget.
 1998, Animusik, Les Mystérieuses Cités D'Or (Bande Originale Du Dessin Animé). CD/VCD reissue, sourced from vinyl, of the LP with 13 bonus tracks in mono, sourced from video tape as the original masters are in a decrepit state. The VCD section contains several video clips. 
 2002, Loga-Rythme, Les Mystérieuses Cités D'Or (La Bande Originale Du Dessin Animé Réorchestrée). Two-CD reorchestration of the full soundtrack by Boub (Yannick Rault).
 2002, Airplay Records, Zia. CD single containing 4 remixes of the title music.
 2008, Fabulous Films, The Mysterious Cities of Gold – Original Soundtrack Album. Twelve-track album, including 10 tracks of music restored and edited from video tape masters by Chris Watson. The album also contains the TV version of the English theme song in stereo, both with and without narration (tracks 1 and 12). This CD was made available as a limited-edition extra with Fabulous Films' DVD release of the series in the UK and Australia.
 2012, XIII Bis Records, Les Mystérieuses Cités D'Or. CD reissue containing 15 tracks from the original LP plus the American/English version of the title theme as a bonus track.
 2013, XIII Bis Records, Les Mystérieuses Cités D'Or – New Edition. CD reissue containing 15 tracks from the original LP plus the American/English version of the title theme and the "Hand Remix" of the title theme as bonus tracks.
 2017, Wagram Music, Les mystérieuses cités d'or (Bande originale de la série télévisée). Thirty-track digital reissue containing all 16 tracks from the original LP, the 13 bonus tracks from the 1998 Animusik release and the English version of the title theme.

Computer games 
Two games have been produced by Ynnis Interactive. The first, The Mysterious Cities of Gold: Flight of the Condor, was released in 2013 only for iOS users on Apple devices. The second was titled The Mysterious Cities of Gold: Secret Paths and was made in 2013 for PC after a successful Kickstarter campaign. The game was released in 2014 for iOS, Wii U and Nintendo 3DS.

References

External links

  
 
 Real precolombians cities in the show 
 
 
 Unofficial French The Mysterious Cities of Gold website 
 
 Animerica review

 
1982 anime television series debuts
1982 French television series debuts
1983 French television series endings
1980s French television series
1980s French animated television series
1980s Nickelodeon original programming
Adventure anime and manga
Atlantis in fiction
BBC children's television shows
Cultural depictions of Francisco Pizarro
Fantasy anime and manga
Fiction set in the 1530s
French children's animated adventure television series
French children's animated fantasy television series
Japanese children's animated adventure television series
Japanese children's animated fantasy television series
Historical anime and manga
NHK original programming
Nickelodeon original programming
Pierrot (company)
Special Broadcasting Service original programming
Television shows based on children's books
Television series by DIC Entertainment
Television series about ancient astronauts
Television series set in the 16th century
TVNZ 2 original programming
Treasure hunt television series